Nicole Saeys (31 August 1924 – 4 September 2021) was a Belgian athlete. She competed in the women's javelin throw at the 1948 Summer Olympics. Saeys died on 4 September 2021, at the age of 97.

References

External links

1924 births
2021 deaths
Athletes (track and field) at the 1948 Summer Olympics
Belgian female javelin throwers
Olympic athletes of Belgium
People from Etterbeek
Sportspeople from Brussels